Devitt is a patronymic surname of Irish origin.

Overview
"Devitt" may be related to the Welsh surname "Davies" as both are Celtic surnames that are generally accepted to mean "son of David", as well as "Davies" potentially stemming from the name of the Irish Déisi dynasty who settled in Wales and western England during the Early Middle Ages, though no theory has been definitively proven for either name.

Notable people with the surname
Amy. J Devitt (born1955), American academic
Don Devitt (1921–2008), Australian politician
Edward Devitt (1911–1992), U.S. Representative and District Judge
Edward I. Devitt (1840–1920), Canadian-American priest
Fergal Devitt (born 1981), Irish professional wrestler better known as Finn Bálor
James Devitt (1929–1989), American politician
Jamie Devitt (born 1990), Irish footballer
John Devitt (born 1937), Australian swimmer and Olympic gold medalist
John Henry Devitt (1851–1940), Canadian politician
John R. Devitt (1917–2000), American politician
Michael Devitt (born 1938), Australian philosopher

Other uses
Devitt baronets (1839–1947), a British baronetcy created for people with the surname
Devitt and Moore (1836–1891), a British shipping company formed by Thomas Henry Devitt and Joseph Moore